Omar Sheika (born February 20, 1977) is an American former professional boxer and multiple time super middleweight world title challenger. He is of Palestinian descent.

Raised in Paterson, New Jersey, Sheika attended Eastside High School and has been a resident of Woodland Park, New Jersey.

Amateur career
Sheika compiled a successful amateur career, capturing a National Middleweight Championship at National AAU Boxing Tournament in 1996.

Professional career
Sheika has enjoyed some success in his pro career. His first fight was against Billy James. Sheika won the fight by TKO on the second round. Sheika stayed undefeated for about a year.

Sheika was involved in ESPN Friday Night Fights "Fight of the Year" in both 2003 and 2004.

Sheika defeated now-imprisoned boxer James Butler in late 2004.
Sheika also defeated future IBF light heavyweight champion Glen Johnson, who went on to defeat Antonio Tarver.

Omar Sheika won against Garrett Wilson on March 26, 2010, by a 4th-round TKO.  On June 18, 2010, Omar continued his winning streak beating Jim Strohl by a 3rd-round TKO.

Sheika suffered his tenth career loss on October 15, 2010, against Adrian Diaconu, with Diaconu winning by unanimous decision after ten rounds of boxing despite Sheika flooring Diaconu with a right earlier in the fight.

On April 23, 2011, Omar lost by unanimous decision against Garrett Wilson after twelve rounds of boxing. The fight was for the vacant USBA Cruiserweight title.

On January 21, 2012, he beat Charles Hayward by unanimous decision over 10 rounds for his title belt, the inaugural "Bad and Mean" Cruiserweight title, though it was fought at the light heavyweight limit of 175 pounds..

On April 27, 2012, Sheika fought Yusaf Mack, losing via unanimous decision.  The fight was for the USBA Light Heavyweight title.

Professional boxing record

|-
|align="center" colspan=8|32 Wins (21 knockouts, 11 decisions), 12 Losses (4 knockouts, 8 decision) 
|-
| align="center" style="border-style: none none solid solid; background: #e3e3e3"|Result
| align="center" style="border-style: none none solid solid; background: #e3e3e3"|Record
| align="center" style="border-style: none none solid solid; background: #e3e3e3"|Opponent
| align="center" style="border-style: none none solid solid; background: #e3e3e3"|Type
| align="center" style="border-style: none none solid solid; background: #e3e3e3"|Round
| align="center" style="border-style: none none solid solid; background: #e3e3e3"|Date
| align="center" style="border-style: none none solid solid; background: #e3e3e3"|Location
| align="center" style="border-style: none none solid solid; background: #e3e3e3"|Notes
|-align=center
|Loss
|align=left|
|align=left| Yusaf Mack
|UD
|12
|27/04/2012
|align=left| Resorts Casino Hotel, Atlantic City, New Jersey
|align=left|
|-
|Win
|
|align=left| [[Anthony Ferrante Boxer]]
|UD
|10
|24/02/2012
|align=left| Harrah's Chester, Chester, Pennsylvania
|align=left|
|-
|Win
|
|align=left| Charles Hayward
|MD
|10
|21/01/2012
|align=left| Hamilton Manor, Hamilton, New Jersey
|align=left|
|-
|Loss
|
|align=left| Garrett "Ultimate Warrior" Wilson
|UD
|12
|23/04/2011
|align=left| Caesars Atlantic City, Atlantic City, New Jersey
|align=left|
|-
|Loss
|
|align=left| Adrian Diaconu
|UD
|10
|15/10/2010
|align=left| Bell Centre, Montreal, Quebec
|align=left|
|-
|Win
|
|align=left| Jim Strohl
|TKO
|3
|18/06/2010
|align=left| Cedar Gardens, Hamilton, New Jersey
|align=left|
|-
|Win
|
|align=left| Garrett "Ultimate Warrior" Wilson
|TKO
|4
|26/03/2010
|align=left| Hamilton Manor, Hamilton, New Jersey
|align=left|
|-
|Win
|
|align=left| Theo Kruger
|TKO
|8
|23/09/2009
|align=left| Verizon Wireless Arena, Manchester, New Hampshire
|align=left|
|-
|Loss
|
|align=left| Roy Jones Jr.
|TKO
|5
|21/03/2009
|align=left| Pensacola Civic Center, Pensacola, Florida
|align=left|
|-
|Win
|
|align=left| Tiwon Taylor
|TKO
|4
|29/09/2007
|align=left| Boardwalk Hall, Atlantic City, New Jersey
|align=left|
|-
|Loss
|
|align=left| Markus Beyer
|UD
|12
|03/09/2005
|align=left| International Congress Centrum, Charlottenburg, Berlin
|align=left|
|-
|Loss
|
|align=left| Jeff Lacy
|UD
|12
|04/12/2004
|align=left| Mandalay Bay, Las Vegas, Nevada
|align=left|
|-
|Win
|
|align=left| James "Harlem Hammer" Butler
|SD
|10
|10/08/2004
|align=left| Essex County College, Newark, New Jersey
|align=left|
|-
|Win
|
|align=left| Manu Ntoh
|UD
|10
|15/06/2004
|align=left| The Belvedere, Elk Grove Village, Illinois
|align=left|
|-
|Win
|
|align=left| Etianne Whitaker
|KO
|2
|14/05/2004
|align=left| Asylum Arena, Philadelphia, Pennsylvania
|align=left|
|-
|Loss
|
|align=left| Scott Pemberton
|TKO
|10
|23/01/2004
|align=left| Foxwoods, Mashantucket, Connecticut
|align=left|
|-
|Loss
|
|align=left| Scott Pemberton
|SD
|12
|25/07/2003
|align=left| Foxwoods, Mashantucket, Connecticut
|align=left|
|-
|Loss
|
|align=left| Eric Lucas
|UD
|12
|06/09/2002
|align=left| Bell Centre, Montreal, Quebec
|align=left|
|-
|Loss
|
|align=left| Thomas Tate
|RTD
|4
|05/10/2001
|align=left| First Union Center, Philadelphia, Pennsylvania
|align=left|
|-
|Win
|
|align=left| Lionel Ortiz
|TKO
|7
|08/06/2001
|align=left| Turning Stone Resort & Casino, Verona, New York
|align=left|
|-
|Win
|
|align=left| Stephane Ouellet
|TKO
|2
|07/04/2001
|align=left| MGM Grand Garden Arena, Las Vegas, Nevada
|align=left|
|-
|Win
|
|align=left| Lloyd Bryan
|TKO
|1
|24/11/2000
|align=left| JFK High School, Paterson, New Jersey
|align=left|
|-
|Loss
|
|align=left| Joe Calzaghe
|TKO
|5
|12/08/2000
|align=left| Wembley Conference Centre, Wembley, London
|align=left|
|-
|Win
|
|align=left| Glen "Road Warrior" Johnson
|MD
|10
|02/06/2000
|align=left| The Blue Horizon, Philadelphia, Pennsylvania
|align=left|
|-
|Win
|
|align=left| Simon "Mantequilla" Brown
|UD
|8
|08/01/2000
|align=left| The Pit, Albuquerque, New Mexico
|align=left|
|-
|Win
|
|align=left| Kevin Pompey
|TKO
|8
|07/08/1999
|align=left| Trump Taj Mahal, Atlantic City, New Jersey
|align=left|
|-
|Win
|
|align=left| Demetrius Jenkins
|TKO
|3
|14/05/1999
|align=left| Pikesville Armory, Pikesville, Maryland
|align=left|
|-
|Win
|
|align=left| Anwar Oshana
|TKO
|3
|22/01/1999
|align=left| Carmichael's, Chicago, Illinois
|align=left|
|-
|Win
|
|align=left| Ray Domenge
|KO
|2
|31/10/1998
|align=left| Atlantic City Convention Center, Atlantic City, New Jersey
|align=left|
|-
|Loss
|
|align=left| Tony Booth
|PTS
|8
|18/07/1998
|align=left| Sheffield Arena, Sheffield, Yorkshire
|align=left|
|-
|Win
|
|align=left| Toks Owoh
|TKO
|4
|25/04/1998
|align=left| Wales National Ice Rink, Cardiff
|align=left|
|-
|Win
|
|align=left| Paul Wesley
|RTD
|4
|07/03/1998
|align=left| Rivermead Leisure Centre, Reading, Berkshire
|align=left|
|-
|Win
|
|align=left| Demetrius Davis
|MD
|8
|02/12/1997
|align=left| The Blue Horizon, Philadelphia, Pennsylvania
|align=left|
|-
|Win
|
|align=left| Maurice Bruton
|TKO
|2
|11/11/1997
|align=left| War Memorial Auditorium, Fort Lauderdale, Florida
|align=left|
|-
|Win
|
|align=left| Pat Pernsley
|UD
|6
|28/10/1997
|align=left| The Blue Horizon, Philadelphia, Pennsylvania
|align=left|
|-
|Win
|
|align=left| Chris Cuellar
|TKO
|2
|07/10/1997
|align=left| The Palace of Auburn Hills, Auburn Hills, Michigan
|align=left|
|-
|Win
|
|align=left| Tyrone Glover
|UD
|8
|01/09/1997
|align=left| Medieval Times, Lyndhurst, New Jersey
|align=left|
|-
|Win
|
|align=left| Sean Sample
|TKO
|1
|29/07/1997
|align=left| MSG Theater, New York City
|align=left|
|-
|Win
|
|align=left| Jose "Bert" Burgos
|KO
|1
|24/06/1997
|align=left| Argosy Festival Atrium, Baton Rouge, Louisiana
|align=left|
|-
|Win
|
|align=left| Robert Doyle
|TKO
|2
|03/06/1997
|align=left| The Blue Horizon, Philadelphia, Pennsylvania
|align=left|
|-
|Win
|
|align=left| John James
|UD
|4
|20/05/1997
|align=left| Medieval Times, Lyndhurst, New Jersey
|align=left|
|-
|Win
|
|align=left| Maxime Belanger
|TKO
|2
|06/05/1997
|align=left| Medieval Times, Lyndhurst, New Jersey
|align=left|
|-
|Win
|
|align=left| Will McIntyre
|UD
|4
|15/04/1997
|align=left| West Orange, New Jersey
|align=left|
|-
|Win
|
|align=left| Billy James
|TKO
|2
|18/03/1997
|align=left| IMA Sports Arena, Flint, Michigan
|align=left|
|}

References

External links
 
Showtime Bio

1977 births
Living people
Boxers from New Jersey
Eastside High School (Paterson, New Jersey) alumni
People from Woodland Park, New Jersey
Super-middleweight boxers
Sportspeople from Paterson, New Jersey
American people of Palestinian descent
Winners of the United States Championship for amateur boxers
American male boxers